Irina-Camelia Begu and Raluca Olaru were the defending champions, but chose not to participate together. Olaru played alongside Mihaela Buzărnescu, but lost in the semifinals to Danka Kovinić and Maryna Zanevska. Begu teamed up with Andreea Mitu and successfully defended the title, defeating Kovinić and Zanevska in the final, 6–3, 6–4.

Seeds

Draw

Draw

References
 Main Draw

Bucharest Open - Doubles
2018 Doubles